Kentucky Route 89 (KY 89) is a  north–south two-lane state highway that runs from Kentucky Route 490 east of Livingston to Kentucky Route 627 in Winchester in the U.S. state of Kentucky. The highway goes through McKee, Irvine.

The route intersects with U.S. Route 421, Kentucky Route 52, Kentucky Route 499, Kentucky Route 974, and U.S. Route 60.

Major intersections

References

0089
0089
0089 
0089
0089